The End of Summer Weenie Roast is an alternative rock festival annually in Charlotte, North Carolina, United States, at the PNC Music Pavilion. The festival was founded by the local modern alternative rock radio station, WEND. It happens some time in  September to celebrate the end of summer.

2015 Lineup

 Stone Temple Pilots ft. Chester Bennington
 Passion Pit
 Bleachers
 Atlas Genius
 Live
 Mutemath
 Blues Traveler
 X Ambassadors
 Catfish and the Bottlemen
 IAMDYNAMITE
 Langhorne Slim and The Law
 Kopecky
 DJ Skratch 'N Sniff

2014 Lineup

 Weezer
 Foster The People
 Fitz and the Tantrums
 J Roddy Walston and the Business
 Fuel
 Foxy Shazam
 Wild Cub
 Bear Hands
 The Pretty Reckless
 Big Data
 Sir Sly
 Flagship
 IAMDYNAMITE
 DJ Skratch 'N Sniff

2013 Lineup

 Thirty Seconds to Mars
 Sublime with Rome
 Awolnation
 Sick Puppies
 Filter
 The Airborne Toxic Event
 New Politics
 Manchester Orchestra
 Biffy Clyro
 Langhorne Slim and The Law
 Matrimony
 The Unlikely Candidates
 Leogun
 DJ Skratch 'N Sniff
 Beyond The Broken

2012 Lineup
 The Offspring
 Garbage
 Flogging Molly
 Coheed and Cambria
 Switchfoot
 Our Lady Peace
 Anberlin
 Eve 6
 Paper Tongues
 Evans Blue
 Foxy Shazam
 Vess
 DJ Skratch 'N Sniff

2002 Lineup
 Nickelback
 FIlter
 Default
 Our Lady Peace
 SR-71
 Doves
 Andrew WK
 Butch Walker
 Goldfinger
 Berlin
 Greenwheel
 Epidemic

References
 http://www.1065.com/
 http://clclt.com/vibes/archives/2012/06/07/1065-weenie-roast-returns-on-september-16
 http://clclt.com/theclog/archives/2013/07/08/2013-1065-weenie-roast-bands-announced-maybe
 http://www.1065.com/articles/1065-the-end-464524/end-of-summer-weenie-roast-14-12434600
 https://www.facebook.com/1065TheEnd/videos/10153458676974365/
 http://theonlyshimmy.faithweb.com/custom.html

Alternative rock festivals
Rock festivals in the United States
Festivals in North Carolina
Events in Charlotte, North Carolina